The Commemorative Medal of the Reign of King Albert I was a Belgian military medal established on 17 February 1962 to commemorate the reign of Albert I of Belgium. 

It was awarded to serving members of the Belgian Armed Forces and to veterans of the service who served honorably between 18 December 1909 and 18 February 1934.

Award description
The Commemorative Medal of the Reign of King Albert I was a 32mm in diameter circular bronze medal.  Its obverse bore the relief left profile of King Albert I wearing a military helmet adorned with a laurel wreath and a military overcoat with the collar up.  The relief inscription in Latin along the upper circumference "ALBERTUS" and at the bottom, "REX" meaning "Albert" "King".  On the reverse, a large relief capital letter A under a royal crown between two vertical branches, oak at left and laurel at right, at the bottom, the years "1909" and "1934".

The medal was suspended by a ring through the suspension loop from a 38mm wide silk moiré yellow ribbon with a 2mm wide central green stripe.

Notable recipients (partial list)
The individuals listed below were awarded the Commemorative Medal of the Reign of King Albert I:
Lieutenant General Baron Charles de Cumont
Lieutenant General Baron Albert Crahay
Cavalry Lieutenant General Marcel Jooris
Cavalry Major General Baron Beaudoin de Maere d’Aertrycke

See also
 List of Orders, Decorations and Medals of the Kingdom of Belgium

References

Other sources
 Quinot H., 1950, Recueil illustré des décorations belges et congolaises, 4e Edition. (Hasselt)
 Cornet R., 1982, Recueil des dispositions légales et réglementaires régissant les ordres nationaux belges. 2e Ed. N.pl.,  (Brussels)
 Borné A.C., 1985, Distinctions honorifiques de la Belgique, 1830-1985 (Brussels)

External links
Bibliothèque royale de Belgique (In French)
Les Ordres Nationaux Belges (In French)

Orders, decorations, and medals of Belgium
Military awards and decorations of Belgium
Awards established in 1962
1962 establishments in Belgium